Tanya Beths (born 16 January 1989) is an Australian Beach Handball player.

She competed for Australia at the 2014 Beach Handball World Championships in Brazil and the 2019 World Beach Games in Qatar. She is also a secondary school teacher that has launched her own pilot program in a number of schools throughout Queensland. A high performance sport program for students with disabilities.

Achievements

 General:
 Queensland Day Award: 2019
 Handball:
 Australia Squad: 2013,2014,2015,2019,2020
 All Star: 2015
 World Beach Handball Championships 2014: 12th
 The World Games 2013: 9th
 The World Beach Games 2019: 11th 
 The Caribbean Pre World Championships Exhibition Tournament: SILVER
 National Champion:2013,2014,2015, 2019
 Volleyball:
 Australian Trans Tasmin Team - Vice Captain
  Current National Tour Series Ranking: 5th
  Current Queensland State Tour Ranking: 3rd
  Queensland Best Defender: 2015, 2016 
  Queensland Best Setter: 20018, 2019
 Queensland Australian Volleyball League Squad Member (AVL): 2007,2008, 2009
 Cheerleading:
 Australia Squad: 2007,2008,2012,2013
 JamFest Championships, Las Vegas: 2012
 Calgary Stampede: 2008
 Olympic Weightlifting:
 Contract: Leeds, England: 2011–2012
 Club: Leeds Carnegie High Performance
 British Weightlifting University Championships – 63kg Class: GOLD
 Bobsled:
 Australia Squad: 2011,2012

Beach handball career 
She is part of the Queensland state team and contributed to winning gold during the Australian Championships 2015, and Silver in 2013, 2016, 2020.
2015 : Australian Beach Handball Championships - All Star Team (Best right wing defense)
2016 : Australian Beach Handball Championships - All Star Team (Best right wing defense)

Indoor handball career 
She was part of the Queensland state team for the Australian Championships and contributed to obtaining a gold medal in 2014.

International indoor handball career 
She was part of the Australian Indoor team in 2015 & 2016 and was selected to represent Australia with the Senior team at the Oceania Qualifiers in Australia (2016).

International beach handball career 
Selected in the Australian Team for the 2019 World Beach Games in Qatar, she was part of the Australian team that secured a 12th position at World Championships in Brazil.She is currently in the Australian squad with selections for the 2020 World Championships due to be made in April.

See also
 World Women's Beach Handball Championship
 Beach handball at the World Games

References

External links
 
 
 

1989 births
Living people
Australian female handball players
Australian women's beach volleyball players
Beach handball players